Mark Alt (born October 18, 1991) is an American professional ice hockey defenseman who is currently under contract with Straubing Tigers of the Deutsche Eishockey Liga (DEL).

Playing career
Alt was a two sport star at Cretin-Derham Hall High School in Minnesota. Having begun playing hockey at the age of 5, Alt was later part of the team that qualified for the 2009 Minnesota high school hockey tournament. He was earlier drafted 2nd overall in the 2007 Futures United States Hockey League draft by the Chicago Steel, however elected to continue playing exclusively with Cretin-Derham Hall and was a Finalist for the 2010 Minnesota Mr. Hockey Award.

On the football field, Alt played quarterback for the 2009 Minnesota state football championship team, throwing 26 touchdowns and running for 6. He was offered football scholarships to the University of Iowa, University of Akron and University of Kansas before ultimately opting against his father's advise to pursue a hockey career in committing to the University of Minnesota under the guide of head coach Don Lucia.

Amateur
Alt was selected 53rd overall in the 2010 NHL Entry Draft by the Carolina Hurricanes. He joined the Golden Gophers of the Western Collegiate Hockey Association in the 2010–11 season. After missing the first game of the season, he participated in 35 consecutive games. His 10 points (two goals, eight assists) ranked fourth among Gophers defenders in points. He played in his first NCAA game on October 9, 2010 versus Massachusetts. In the same game, he logged his first career NCAA point, an assist on the game-winning goal. January 15, 2011, would mark the first NCAA goal of his career, as he scored versus divisional rival North Dakota.

Alt participated in the 2010 U.S. National Junior Evaluation Camp in Lake Placid, New York. Focused on sharpening his defensive shutdown ability, Alt took on a leadership role as a sophomore in the 2011–12 season, while increasing his points totals with 5 goals and 22 points in 43 games.

In his junior season in the 2012–13 season, Alt fully transitioned to a shutdown defense role in recording just 7 assists in 39 games for the Gophers. During the campaign, Alt's NHL rights were traded by the Hurricanes to the Philadelphia Flyers on January 13, 2013 along with Brian Boucher for Luke Pither. For a second consecutive year he was selected to the WCHA All-Academic Team with a 4.0 grade average.

Professional

Philadelphia Flyers
After his third season of collegiate hockey with the Golden Gophers having scored 39 points in 117 collegiate games, Alt signed a three-year entry level contract with the Philadelphia Flyers on April 7, 2013. He immediately joined the Flyers American Hockey League primary affiliate, the Adirondack Phantoms on an amateur try-out contract to finish the 2012–13 regular season. Appearing in 6 games with the Phantoms, Alt earned praise from veteran NHL and blueline partner in Andreas Lilja.

In his first full professional season, Alt was reassigned to continue with the Adirondack Phantoms for the duration of the 2013–14 season. He tied second on the club amongst defenseman with 22 assists and 26 points in 75 games. In the 2014–15 season, Alt was again reassigned to the AHL by the Flyers, joining new affiliate, the Lehigh Valley Phantoms for their inaugural season. Limited to just 44 games through injury, Alt returned with 2 goals and 10 points. In continuing his upward development the Flyers, Alt was recalled on emergency, and made his NHL debut in playing 9:25 with Philadelphia in a 3-2 shootout defeat to the San Jose Sharks on March 28, 2015.

In the final year of his entry-level contract, Alt remained exclusively in the AHL with the Phantoms in the 2015–16 season, appearing in a further 72 games, paired alongside Samuel Morin in a shutdown role, and while also collecting 4 goals and 19 points. On June 26, 2016, he agreed to a one-year, two-way contract to remain with the Flyers.

He was familiarly reassigned to return for his fourth season in the AHL in 2016–17. He was limited to just 40 games through injury, recording 1 goals and 11 points as the Phantoms reached the post-season for the first time in franchise history. Despite his reduced impact he placed second on the club in plus-minus (+8). As an impending restricted free agent, Alt was again re-signed to a one-year, two-way contract to return for his sixth season  within the Flyers organization on June 27, 2017.

In preparation for the 2017–18 season, Alt was among the last cuts at the Flyers training camp and was familiarly assigned to Lehigh Valley. As the Phantoms best defenseman to start the year, Alt returned to the NHL for the first time in three seasons, as he was again used on an emergency basis in a 4-3 overtime defeat to the Arizona Coyotes on October 31, 2017. He was later officially recalled and featured in 7 more games before he was returned to the Phantoms on December 30, 2017. Alt posted 10 points in 23 games in the AHL before receiving his third recall to Flyers on January 22, 2018.

Colorado Avalanche
As the Flyers reserve depth blueline, Alt was a frequent healthy scratch and failed to feature in a game in over a month before he was placed on waivers in order to return to the AHL. On February 26, 2018, Alt was claimed off waivers by the Colorado Avalanche. With the Avalanche vying for a playoff position, he assumed the same role with the club and remained in the press box until making his belated debut with Colorado in a 2-1 shootout victory over the Vegas Golden Knights on March 24, 2018. He featured in 7 scoreless games with the Avalanche to end the regular season and remained a healthy scratch in their first-round defeat to the Nashville Predators in the playoffs.

On May 11, 2018, Alt gave up his impending free agent status in signing a two-year, two-way extension with the Avalanche. After attending his first training camp with the Avalanche, Alt was among the last cuts prior to the 2018–19 season. He was reassigned to new AHL affiliate, the Colorado Eagles, and was selected as team captain on October 4, 2018.

Los Angeles Kings
Following two seasons as the Eagles captain, Alt left the Avalanche as a free agent at the conclusion of his contract. On October 9, 2020, Alt was signed to a one-year, two-way contract with the Los Angeles Kings. In the pandemic delayed  season, Alt made a return to the NHL in featuring in 2 games with the Kings before he was assigned to AHL affiliate, the Ontario Reign, for the remainder of the campaign. As an alternate captain, Alt appeared in 29 regular season games with the Reign, collecting 2 goals and 7 points.

Later Years
As a free agent from the Kings, Alt was unable to attract an NHL contract, opting to continue in the AHL in signing a one-year contract with the San Jose Barracuda, the primary affiliate to the San Jose Sharks, on August 2, 2021. In the following 2021–22 season, Alt as an alternate captain appeared in 46 regular season games with the Barracuda, posting 3 goals and 8 points. On March 28, 2022, Alt was traded by the Barracuda to the Rochester Americans in exchange for Mason Jobst.

As a free agent leading into the 2022–23 season, Alt was belatedly signed to his first contract abroad in agreeing to join German club, Straubing Tigers of the DEL, for the remainder of the season on February 8, 2023.

Personal life
Alt's father, John, played left tackle in for the Kansas City Chiefs of the National Football League (NFL). He played in three Pro Bowls from 1984 to 1996. Alt was born in Kansas City, while his father was playing for the Chiefs.

Career statistics

Awards and honors

References

External links
 

1991 births
Living people
Adirondack Phantoms players
American men's ice hockey defensemen
Carolina Hurricanes draft picks
Colorado Avalanche players
Colorado Eagles players
Ice hockey people from Missouri
Lehigh Valley Phantoms players
Los Angeles Kings players
Minnesota Golden Gophers men's ice hockey players
Ontario Reign (AHL) players
Philadelphia Flyers players
Rochester Americans players
San Jose Barracuda players
Sportspeople from Kansas City, Missouri